Michael E. Sodrel (born December 17, 1945) is an American politician and businessman who served as a member of the United States House of Representatives for Indiana's 9th congressional district from 2005 to 2007. Sodrel launched another run against incumbent Democratic Rep. Baron Hill in 2010 – his fifth straight run for Congress in the ninth district. However, he lost the Republican nomination to Bloomington attorney Todd Young, who won the general election.

In 2022, after a twelve-year political retirement, Sodrel announced he was running for his old seat in the 2022 United States House of Representatives elections in Indiana.

Early life
Born in Louisville, Kentucky, Sodrel grew up across the Ohio River in New Albany, Indiana. He graduated New Albany High School in 1963. Sodrel attended Indiana University Southeast in New Albany, Indiana.

Career 
From 1966 to 1973, Sodrel served in the 151st Infantry Regiment of the Indiana National Guard. He was honorably discharged with the rank of staff sergeant. Since 1963, Sodrel has worked at his family's business, Sodrel Truck Lines Inc. He founded the Free Enterprise System Inc. (a charter motor-coach/contract passenger-carrier) and Sodrel Logistics.

Sodrel is the author of an internet book, Citizen Sheep Government Shepherds.

U.S. House of Representatives 

Sodrel served as a member of the United States House Committee on Agriculture, United States House Committee on Transportation and Infrastructure, United States House Committee on Small Business, and United States House Committee on Science.

During his term, Sodrel opposed partial-birth abortions and federal funding for elective abortions. He opposed additional environmental regulations. He has outspokenly supported the right to bear arms. He has a 92 lifetime rating from the American Conservative Union, and a zero rating from the League of Conservation Voters. He is in favor of permanently repealing the federal estate tax.

In 2006 Sodrel introduced a bill that would prevent federal courts from ruling on the content of speech in state legislatures. The proposal came as a response to  U.S. District Judge David Hamilton's ruling that official Indiana House proceedings could not begin with sectarian prayers that advanced any particular religion.

Political campaigns
Sodrel has campaigned on a platform of creating and protecting jobs, lowering taxes and values. He drives his own 18-wheeler on the campaign trail. He first ran for the House of Representatives in 2002, losing to incumbent Baron Hill, 51% to 46%. In the 2004 rematch, he defeated Hill by 1,500 votes.

2006
Sodrel faced Hill again in the 2006 general election. The Cook Political Report, an independent nonpartisan newsletter, rated the race as a toss-up.

President George W. Bush came to a Sodrel fundraiser in Indianapolis early in 2006, while his opponent gained help in Indianapolis with fundraisers from former President Bill Clinton.

Sodrel ultimately lost his bid for re-election by a margin of 45% to 50%. The candidates raised equivalent funds in 2006.

Texas millionaire Bob J. Perry gave more than $5 million to the Economic Freedom Fund, a 527 group, which included Hill as one of its targets for removal. The group paid for automated "push poll" calls attacking Hill. These calls stopped after action by the Indiana Attorney General.

2008

In October 2007 Sodrel announced that he would run again in 2008 for the Congressional seat against Baron Hill, whom he defeated in 2004 but to whom he lost in 2002 and 2006.
In 2006 Cook rated the race as a toss-up for the duration of the race, but in 2008 the race moved between Likely D to Lean D on the Cook Political Report.
Sodrel's fundraising was weak compared both to Hill and Sodrel's 2006 figures.

Hill defeated Sodrel in the election, 58% to 39%.

2010

On January 11, 2010, at an event in Jeffersonville, Indiana, Mike Sodrel announced that he would again seek the 2010 Republican nomination for the 9th congressional seat. He joined two other candidates in the field of Republican contenders: Bloomington attorney Todd Young (a native of Carmel, Indiana) and Columbus real-estate investor Travis Hankins. A poll published by the left-leaning weblog Firedoglake showed Sodrel leading Hill 49–41 in a head-to-head race. However he lost the Republican nomination, coming in third place behind Travis Hankins and winner Todd Young. Young won the general election against Hill.

2022 

On February 8, 2022, Sodrel announced that he would once again seek the Republican nomination for the ninth district after three-term representative Trey Hollingsworth announced his retirement. Sodrel is one of nine Republicans seeking the nomination in the district.

Electoral history

Write-in and minor candidate notes: In 2006, Donald W. Mantooth received 33 votes.

Personal life
In 1967, Sodrel married Marquita Dean; they have two children and seven granddaughters. Sodrel has served on numerous charitable organization's board of directors, including the Remnant Trust and as a past regional council president of the Boy Scouts of America.

References

External links
 
 
 FairTax Mike Sodrel is a supporter and cosponsor (Link no longer works)
 Firedoglake blog article
 

|-

1945 births
21st-century American politicians
American trucking industry businesspeople
Baptists from Kentucky
Businesspeople from Indiana
Candidates in the 2022 United States House of Representatives elections
Living people
Military personnel from Indiana
People from New Albany, Indiana
Politicians from Louisville, Kentucky
United States Army soldiers
Republican Party members of the United States House of Representatives from Indiana